Brandis is a German surname. Notable people with the surname include:

 Christian August Brandis, German philologist and historian of philosophy
 Dietrich Brandis, German forester considered the father of tropical forestry
 George Brandis, Australian politician
 Jock Brandis, Canadian author, film technician, and inventor.
 Mark Brandis, German science fiction writer and journalist
 Jonathan Brandis, American actor, director, and screenwriter. 
 Thomas Brandis, German violinist, former concertmaster of the Berlin Philharmonic
 Lata Brandisová, Czech equestrian

See also 
 Brandys (disambiguation)
 Brandeis
 Brandejs
 Brandes (disambiguation)
 Brindisi

German-language surnames